Frankenheim is a municipality in the district of Schmalkalden-Meiningen, in Thuringia, Germany.

References

Municipalities in Thuringia
Rhön Mountains
Schmalkalden-Meiningen
Grand Duchy of Saxe-Weimar-Eisenach